Lera Auerbach (born Valeria Lvovna Averbakh, ; October 21, 1973) is a Soviet-born Austrian-American classical composer, conductor and concert pianist.

Early life and education
Auerbach was born to a Jewish family in Chelyabinsk, a city in the Ural Mountains. Her mother was a piano teacher, many of whose ancestors had also been musicians. Lera began composing her own music at an early age; she later told an interviewer, "I was born to do this, to work in art... I had this feeling when I was four and I had it when I came to New York...". She received permission to visit the United States on a concert tour in 1991; although she spoke no English, she decided to defect so she could stay in the country to pursue her musical career. She graduated from New York's Juilliard School in piano (under Joseph Kalichstein) and composition (under Milton Babbitt and Robert Beaser). Her graduate studies were supported by The Paul & Daisy Soros Fellowships for New Americans. She also studied comparative literature at Columbia University and earned a piano diploma at the Hochschule für Musik Hannover.

Performances
Auerbach made her Carnegie Hall debut in May 2002, performing her own Suite for Violin, Piano and Orchestra with violinist Gidon Kremer conducting the Kremerata Baltica. She has appeared as solo pianist at such venues as the Great Concert Hall of the Moscow Conservatory, Tokyo's Opera City, Lincoln Center, Herkulessaal, Oslo konserthus, Chicago's Theodore Thomas Orchestra Hall and the Kennedy Center.

Compositions
Auerbach's compositions have been commissioned and performed by a wide array of artists, orchestras, choirs and ballet companies including Gidon Kremer, the Kremerata Baltica, David Finckel, Wu Han, Vadim Gluzman, the Tokyo, Kuss, Parker and Petersen String Quartets, the SWR and NDR symphony orchestras, Berg Orchestra, Netherlands Chamber Choir, RIAS Kammerchor, and the Royal Danish Ballet. Auerbach's music has also been commissioned by and performed at Caramoor International Music Festival, Lucerne Festival, Lockenhaus Festival, Bremen Musikfest and Schleswig-Holstein Musik Festival.

A commission by The Royal Danish Ballet, to celebrate Hans Christian Andersen's bicentenary in 2005, was Lera Auerbach's second collaboration with choreographer John Neumeier. The ballet is a modern rendition of the classic fairy tale The Little Mermaid and was premiered in April 2005 at the then newly opened Copenhagen Opera House.

Her Double Concerto for Violin, Piano and Orchestra, Op. 40, was written in 1997, but not premiered until December 15, 2006, in Stuttgart by the Stuttgart Radio Symphony Orchestra conducted by Andrey Boreyko; the soloists were violinist Vadim Gluzman and pianist Angela Yoffe. The American premiere was on February 13, 2010, by the Fort Wayne Philharmonic Orchestra conducted by Andrew Constantine; the soloists were violinist Jennifer Koh and pianist Benjamin Hochman.

In 2007, her Symphony No. 1 "Chimera" received its world premiere by the Düsseldorf Symphony. Other 2007 premieres included Symphony No. 2 "Requiem for a Poet" by Hannover's NDR Radio Philharmonic, as well as  A Russian Requiem (on Russian Orthodox sacred texts and poetry by Alexander Pushkin, Gavrila Derzhavin, Mikhail Lermontov, Boris Pasternak, Osip Mandelstam, Alexander Blok, Zinaida Gippius, Anna Akhmatova, Joseph Brodsky, Viktor Sosnora and Irina Ratushinskaya) by the Bremen Philharmonic with the Latvian National Choir and the Estonian Opera Boys Choir.

Vienna's historic Theater an der Wien debuted Auerbach's full-length opera based on her original play Gogol in November 2011.

Auerbach's a cappella opera The Blind (based on a play by Maurice Maeterlinck) was performed in a controversial new production by John La Bouchardière at Lincoln Center for Performing Arts, New York, in July 2013, throughout which the entire audience was blindfolded. Auerbach stated, "The message is that we are the blind. With all our means of communications, we see each other less and connect less. We have less understanding and compassion for other people. We have this screen between us." In a Gramophone article on Auerbach, 24 Preludes for piano (1999) is listed as her breakthrough piece, Sogno di Stabat Mater (2007) is described as one of her "most direct and striking compositions", and her score for John Neumeier's adaptation of The Little Mermaid is praised as "vivid". Her 2018 piece Labyrinth was praised by Joshua Kosman as "a formidable and richly textured addition to the piano literature". Her 2019 piece Arctica also garnered acclaim.

Awards and recognition
In 2005 Auerbach received the Hindemith Prize from the Schleswig-Holstein Musik Festival. In the same year she received the Förderpreis Deutschlandfunk and the Bremer Musikfest Prize; she was composer-in-residence in Bremen.

She is the youngest composer to be represented by music publisher Internationale Musikverlage Hans Sikorski of Hamburg, Germany.

In 2007, she was selected as a member of the forum of Young Global Leaders by the World Economic Forum in Davos, Switzerland.

Works

Main orchestral works 
 2007: Russian Requiem
 2008: Fragile Solitudes, Shadowbox for String Quartet and orchestra
 2010: Eterniday, for bass drum, celesta and Strings 
 2012: Post Silentium, for orchestra

Concerto 
 1997–98: Piano Concerto No. 1, Op. 39
 Part 1) River of Loss, Dialogue with Time, Wind of Oblivion
 Part 2) Dialogue with Time (can be performed separately as an orchestral piece with the piano being part of the orchestra)
 1997: Double Concerto for violin, piano and orchestra, Op. 40
 2000 (2003): Violin Concerto No. 1, Op. 56
 2001: Suite Concertante for violin, piano and Strings, Op. 60
 2002: Serenade for a Melancholic Sea, for violin, cello, piano and String orchestra, Op. 68
 2004: Violin Concerto No. 2 in one movement, Op. 77 
 2005: Dreams and Whispers of Poseidon, symphonic poem
 2017: Violin Concerto No. 4 (NYx) (David Geffen Hall), Leonidas Kavakos (violin), New York Philharmonic, Alan Gilbert

Symphony 
 2006: Symphony No. 1 Chimera, for large orchestra (last two movements can be performed separately as symphonic poem Icarus)
 2006: Symphony No. 2 Requiem for a Poet, for mezzo-soprano, cello, choir and orchestra 
 2013: Memoria de la Luz, String Symphony No. 1 (Arrangement of the String Quartet No. 2 Primera Luz)
 2016: Symphony No. 3 The Infant Minstrel and His Peculiar Menagerie, for violin, choir and orchestra

Main choral works 
72 Angels, for choir and saxophone quartet
Goetia 72, in umbra lucis, for choir and string quartet

Recordings 
Sonata for Violoncello and Piano, op. 69 (2002) (ArtistLed 11001-2)
24 Preludes for Violin and Piano, Op. 46 (BIS 2003)
Tolstoy's Waltz (BIS 2004)
Auerbach plays Mozart (ARABESQUE 2005)
Ballet for a Lonely Violinist, Op. 70 (BIS 2005, Feminae 2016)
Preludes and Dreams containing 24 Preludes for piano, Op.41;  Ten Dreams, Op.45 and Chorale, Fugue and Postlude, Op.31(BIS 2006)
Cetera Desunt, String Quartet No. 3 (CAPRICCIO 2006)
Flight and Fire (PROFIL – Hänssler Classics 2007)
Sogno di Stabat Mater (2005, rev. 2009) (Nonesuch Records 287228-2)
Celloquy containing 24 Preludes for Violincello and Piano, Op. 47 and Sonata for Violincello and Piano, Op. 69 (Cedille Records 2013)
T'filah (Feminae 2016)
72 Angels for choir and saxophone quartet (Alpha593 2019)

References

Further reading 
 "The Very Last of Soviet Émigré Composers: Lera Auerbach", 17-page article at Academia.edu; by Christoph Flamm, Professor of Applied Musicology at the University of Klagenfurt, Austria (free registration required)

External links 
 

1973 births
Living people
20th-century American composers
20th-century American women musicians
20th-century American musicians
20th-century classical composers
20th-century women composers
21st-century American composers
21st-century American pianists
21st-century American women pianists
21st-century classical composers
21st-century classical pianists
21st-century women composers
American classical composers
American classical pianists
American women classical composers
American people of Russian-Jewish descent
American women classical pianists
American women writers
Composers for carillon
Jewish American classical composers
Juilliard School alumni
Musicians from Chelyabinsk
Russian classical pianists
Russian emigrants to the United States
Russian women classical composers
Russian classical composers
Russian Jews
Russian women pianists
Russian women writers
World Economic Forum Young Global Leaders
21st-century American Jews
Cedille Records artists